The Brookville BL12CG is a 4-axle diesel-electric locomotive built by the Brookville Equipment Corporation. The locomotive is designed to meet Tier 4 emissions standards. The first two were delivered to the Central California Traction Company in April 2015.

References 

B-B locomotives
BL12CG
EPA Tier 4-compliant locomotives of the United States
Standard gauge locomotives of the United States
Railway locomotives introduced in 2015